Wolfgang Nonn (24 November 1935 – 26 August 1959) was a German field hockey player who competed in the 1956 Summer Olympics.

References

External links
 

1935 births
1959 deaths
German male field hockey players
Olympic field hockey players of the United Team of Germany
Field hockey players at the 1956 Summer Olympics
Olympic bronze medalists for the United Team of Germany
Olympic medalists in field hockey
Medalists at the 1956 Summer Olympics
20th-century German people